Aalayam is a 1967 Indian Tamil-language drama film directed by the duo Thirumalai–Mahalingam and written by A. Bhimsingh. Based on the play Nenje Nee Vaazhga, it stars Major Sundarrajan, with Nagesh, Srikanth and V. K. Ramasamy playing supporting roles.

The film happens in one day, largely in an office and revolves around the theme of human values of honesty and integrity. The soundtrack was composed by T. K. Ramamoorthy. The film's cinematography was handled by Vittalrao, while A. Pauldurai Singam handled the editing. The film was released on 11 August 1967. It was critically acclaimed, and won the National Film Award for Best Feature Film in Tamil.

Plot 

Ramalingam is an honest, principled man, working as a clerk in a company. He values integrity and discipline as the doctrines of daily life. But his honesty is put to test when his son-in-law Raghu comes to him with a big problem. Raghu has misplaced some money in the bank in which he works, and he requests Ramalingam to give him money so that he could make good the loss. Ramalingam expresses his inability to raise such an amount at short notice. At that instant, a businessman approaches Ramalingam with a bribe of Rs. 5000 to get his work done. Ramalingam sends him away in a rage. His daughter Kamala and wife keep pressuring him to help Raghu. The inner conflicts that torture Ramalingam in that single day and the final decision that he takes form rest of the film.

Cast 
Major Sundarrajan as Ramalingam
Nagesh as Simon
C. Vasantha
V. K. Ramasamy as Paramanandam
Manorama
A. Karunanidhi
A. Veerappan
P. K. Saraswathi
Typist Gopu
Pakoda Kadhar
Srikanth as Raja [Guest Appearance]
Cho [Guest Appearance]

Production 
Aalayam was an adaptation of the stage play Nenje Nee Vaazhga, written by S. Raman, who wrote under the pseudonym Pilahari. Major Sundarrajan played the role of a poor Brahmin clerk, a departure from the roles he was previously known for: zamindars or wealthy, assertive men. Gopu who did the character of typist in the play repeated his character in the film and went on to be known as Typist Gopu. The film's editing was by A. Paulduraisingam, cinematography by G. Vittal Rao and H. Shantaram handled art direction.

Music 
The soundtrack was composed by T. K. Ramamoorthy.

Release and reception 
Aalayam was released on 11 August 1967. Kalki appreciated the film for Thirumalai–Mahalingam's direction, and absence of Tamil cinema clichés like duets. It won the National Film Award for Best Feature Film in Tamil, and the Tamil Nadu State Film Award for Best Film – Second Prize.

References

Bibliography

External links 

1960s Tamil-language films
1967 drama films
1967 films
Best Tamil Feature Film National Film Award winners
Indian black-and-white films
Indian drama films
Indian films based on plays